Gina Mascetti (1911-1995) was an Italian film actress. A character actress, she appeared in a number of comedy films notably as Alberto Sordi's wife in the The White Sheik (1952). The same year she also featured in the neorealist drama Two Cents Worth of Hope.

Selected filmography
 Variety Lights (1950)
 Red Moon (1951)
 Cameriera bella presenza offresi... (1951)
 The White Sheik (1952)
 Two Cents Worth of Hope (1952)
 One Hundred Little Mothers (1952)
 Drama on the Tiber (1952)
 Five Paupers in an Automobile (1952)
 A Parisian in Rome (1954)
 It Happened at the Police Station (1954)
 The Song of the Heart (1955)
 Da qui all'eredità (1955)
 Oh! Sabella (1957)
 Three Strangers in Rome (1958)
 Cavalier in Devil's Castle (1959)
 The Thief of Baghdad (1961)
 The Witch's Curse (1962)
 What Ever Happened to Baby Toto? (1964)
 Pensiero d'amore (1969)
 Trastevere (1971)
 Live Like a Cop, Die Like a Man (1976)

References

Bibliography
 Cardullo, Bert. What is Neorealism?: A Critical English-language Bibliography of Italian Cinematic Neorealism. University Press of America, 1991.
 Carolan, Mary Ann McDonald. The Transatlantic Gaze: Italian Cinema, American Film. SUNY Press, 2014.

External links

1911 births
1995 deaths
Italian film actresses
Film people from Rome

it:Gina Mascetti